is a shōjo romantic comedy manga by Yumiko Suzuki.  It was published by Kodansha in the magazine Mimi from 1988 to 1992 and collected in seven tankōbon volumes. The series was adapted as an anime OVA produced by Ajia-do that was released in 1990, an 11-episode live-action television series broadcast on Fuji TV in 1993, and a theatrical movie released in 1995. In 1989, the manga won the Kodansha Manga Award for shōjo.

It is the story of Reiko Shiratori, a nouveau-riche girl from the countryside, who enters a Tokyo university to pursue ordinary college student Tetsuya Akimoto.

Television dramas

1989 cast
 Honami Suzuki as Reiko Shiratori
 Makoto Nonomura as Tetsuya Akimoto

1993 cast
 Yasuko Matsuyuki as Reiko Shiratori
 Masato Hagiwara as Tetsuya Akimoto

2016 cast
 Mayuko Kawakita as Reiko Shiratori
 Masaru Mizuno as Tetsuya Akimoto

Original video animation

Cast
 Maria Kawamura as Reiko Shiratori
 Kenyu Horiuchi as Tetsuya Akimoto

References

External links
 
 Entry at J-dorama.com (live-action TV show)

1988 manga
1990 anime OVAs
1995 anime films
Ajia-do Animation Works
Fuji TV dramas
Japanese television dramas based on manga
Kodansha manga
Romantic comedy anime and manga
Shōjo manga
Japanese romantic comedy films